The Rosenwald Fund (also known as the Rosenwald Foundation, the Julius Rosenwald Fund, and the Julius Rosenwald Foundation) was established in 1917 by Julius Rosenwald and his family for "the well-being of mankind." Rosenwald became part-owner of Sears, Roebuck and Company in 1895, serving as its president from 1908 to 1922, and chairman of its board of directors until his death in 1932.

History
Unlike other endowed foundations, which were designed to fund themselves in perpetuity, the Rosenwald Fund was designed to expend all of its funds for philanthropic purposes before a predetermined "sunset date." It donated over $70 million to public schools, colleges and universities, museums, Jewish charities, and African American institutions before funds were completely depleted in 1948.

The rural school building program for African-American children was one of the largest programs administered by the Rosenwald Fund.  Over $4.4 million in matching funds stimulated construction of more than 5,000 one-room schools (and larger ones), as well as shops and teachers' homes, mostly in the South, where public schools were segregated and black schools had been chronically underfunded. This was particularly so after disenfranchisement of most blacks from the political system in southern states at the turn of the 20th century. The Fund required white school boards to agree to operate such schools and to arrange for matching funds, in addition to requiring black communities to raise funds or donate property and labor to construct the schools. These schools, constructed to models designed by architects of Tuskegee Normal and Industrial Institute (now known as Tuskegee University), became known as "Rosenwald Schools." In some communities, surviving structures have been preserved and recognized as landmarks for their historical character and social significance. The National Trust for Historic Preservation has classified them as National Treasures.

The Rosenwald Fund also made fellowship grants directly to African-American artists, writers, researchers and intellectuals between 1928 and 1948. Civil rights leader Julian Bond, whose father received a Rosenwald fellowship, has called the list of grantees a "Who's Who of black America in the 1930s and 1940s." Hundreds of grants were disbursed to artists, writers and other cultural figures, many of whom became prominent or already were, including photographers Gordon Parks, Elizabeth Catlett, Marion Palfi, poets Claude McKay, Dr. Charles Drew, Augusta Savage, anthropologist and dancer Katherine Dunham, singer Marian Anderson, silversmith Winifred Mason, writers Ralph Ellison, W.E.B. Du Bois, James Weldon Johnson, psychologists Kenneth and Mamie Clark, dermatologist Theodore K. Lawless, and poets Langston Hughes, Maya Angelou and Rita Dove. Fellowships of around $1,000 to $2,000 were given out yearly to applicants and were usually designed to be open-ended; the Foundation requested but did not require grantees to report back on what they accomplished with the support.

In 1929, the Rosenwald Fund funded a syphilis treatment pilot program in five Southern states. The Rosenwald project emphasized locating people with syphilis and treating them, during a time when syphilis was widespread in poor African-American communities. The Fund ended its involvement in 1932, due to lack of matching state funds (the Fund required jurisdictions to contribute to efforts to increase collaboration on solving problems). After the Fund ceased its involvement, the federal government decided to take over the funding and changed its mission to being a non-therapeutic study. The infamous Tuskegee syphilis study began later that year, tracking the progress of untreated disease, and took advantage of poor participants by not informing them fully of its constraints. Even after penicillin became recognized as approved treatment for this disease, researchers did not treat the study participants.

Notable fellowship recipients 
This is a selected list of notable Rosenwald Fund Fellowship recipients from the years the fund's fellowship program was active, 1928-1948.

See also
Rosenwald Schools
Rosenwald (film)
Julian Mack
Henry H. Rogers
Booker T. Washington

References

Further reading

 Deutsch, Stephanie. You Need a Schoolhouse: Booker T. Washington, Julius Rosenwald, and the Building of Schools for the Segregated South (Northwestern University Press, 2011).
 Embree, Edwin R., and Julia Waxman. Investment in People: The Story of the Julius Rosenwald Fund (Harper and Brothers, 1949).
 Hoffschwelle, Mary S. Preserving Rosenwald Schools (National Trust for Historic Preservation, 2003).
 Hoffschwelle, Mary S. The Rosenwald Schools of the American South (University Press of Florida, 2006).
 Perkins, Alfred. Edwin Rogers Embree: The Julius Rosenwald Fund, Foundation Philanthropy, and American Race Relations (Indiana UP, 2011) excerpt and text search
 Werner, Morris R. Julius Rosenwald: The Life of a Practical Humanitarian (Harper and Brothers, 1939).
 Wilcox, Ralph S. "Rosenwald Schools," Encyclopedia of Arkansas (2023) online

External links
"Historic Black Schools Restored as Landmarks", New York Times, Jan. 15, 2010
Diane Granat, "Saving the Rosenwald Schools"

Educational charities based in the United States
Organizations established in 1917
History of education in the United States
African-American history between emancipation and the civil rights movement
African Americans and education
Rosenwald schools